Shubh Nikah is an Indian 2023 Hindi language family drama film written and directed by Arshad Siddiqui.

The film stars Aksha Pardasany and Rohit Vikkram in the lead roles, with Arsh Sandhu and others appearing in supporting roles. It is scheduled for theatrical release on 17 March 2023.

Cast 
Aksha Pardasany as Zoya Faraz
Rohit Vikkram as Munna Lal Mishra
Arsh Sandhu as Sabir Khan
Govind Namdev as Shyama Lal Mishra
Pankaj Berry as Sufiyan Rabbani
Deepak Rana as SP Arjun Pratap Singh
Ehsan Khan as Nasir Faraz
Kunwar Aziz as Shamshad Faraz
Gargi Patel as Shehnaz Beghum
Rudrakshi as Khalajaan
Liyakat Nasir as Mata Prasad Pandey

References

External links
 
 

2020s Hindi-language films